U-41 may refer to one of the following German submarines:

 , was a Type U 31 submarine launched in 1914 and that served in the First World War until sunk 24 September 1915
 During the First World War, Germany also had these submarines with similar names:
 , a Type UB II submarine launched in 1916 and sunk on 5 October 1917
 , a Type UC II submarine launched in 1916 and sunk on 21 August 1917
 , a Type IX submarine that served in the Second World War until sunk on 5 February 1940

U-41 or U-XLI may also refer to:
 , a  submarine of the Austro-Hungarian Navy

Submarines of Germany